Alex Ozerov (born 1992) is a Canadian actor. He is most noted for his performance in the short film Pyotr495, for which he won the Canadian Screen Award for Best Lead Performance in a Digital Program or Series at the 7th Canadian Screen Awards.

Early life

Ozerov is originally from Tula, Russia. As a young child he lived in Garbolovo, a military town outside Saint Petersburg as his father was a paratrooper in the army. His parents separated when he was six years old and he lived between his mother in England and his father in Ukraine. He moved to Kitchener, Ontario, when he was thirteen after his mother met a man living in Canada. They later settled in Toronto.

Career
He had a couple of small roles in television before being cast in his first major role, as Trevor in the 2012 film Blackbird. He has since appeared in the films Guidance, What We Have, Coconut Hero, and Natasha, and the television series Bitten, Freakish, The Americans, Orphan Black, Cardinal, and Another Life.

Personal life
In 2021 he married Sydney Meyer, his co-star in the series Slasher: Flesh and Blood.

References

External links

1992 births
Canadian male film actors
Canadian male television actors
Canadian Screen Award winners
Russian emigrants to Canada
Male actors from Kitchener, Ontario
Male actors from Toronto
Living people
Actors from Tula, Russia